The men's discus throw event at the 2000 Summer Olympics as part of the athletics program was held at the Olympic Stadium on Sunday, 24 September and Monday, 25 September. Forty-five athletes from 28 nations competed. The event was won by Virgilijus Alekna of Lithuania, the nation's second victory in the men's discus throw. Lars Riedel of Germany took silver, becoming the 13th man to win multiple discus throw medals. Frantz Kruger earned South Africa's first medal in the event with his bronze.

The qualifying athletes progressed through to the final where the qualifying distances are scrapped and they start afresh with up to six throws. The qualifying distance was 64.00 metres. For all qualifiers who did not achieve the standard, the remaining spaces in the final were filled by the longest throws until a total of 12 qualifiers.

Background

This was the 24th appearance of the event, which is one of 12 athletics events to have been held at every Summer Olympics. The top nine finishers from the 1996 Games all returned, along with the last finalist: gold medalist Lars Riedel and sixth-place finisher Jürgen Schult of Germany, silver medalist Vladimir Dubrovshchik and bronze medalist Vasiliy Kaptyukh of Belarus, fourth-place finisher Anthony Washington and twelfth-place finisher Adam Setliff of the United States, fifth-place finisher Virgilijus Alekna and eighth-place finisher Vaclavas Kidykas of Lithuania, seventh-place finisher Vitaliy Sidorov of Ukraine, and ninth-place finisher Alexis Elizalde of Cuba. Schult was the world record holder and had medaled twice before (gold in 1988, silver in 1992). Riedel had won four of the last five world championships; Washington had won the latest. But Alekna had the best results in 2000 so far, hitting the second- and third-best throws to date (Schult's 1986 record still stands as of 2020).

Turkmenistan and Qatar each made their debut in the men's discus throw. The United States made its 23rd appearance, most of any nation, having missed only the boycotted 1980 Games.

Qualification

Each National Olympic Committee was permitted to enter up to three athletes that had thrown 63.50 metres or further during the qualification period. The maximum number of athletes per nation had been set at 3 since the 1930 Olympic Congress. If an NOC had no athletes that qualified under that standard, one athlete that had thrown 62.00 metres or further could be entered.

Competition format

The competition used the two-round format introduced in 1936, with the qualifying round completely separate from the divided final. In qualifying, each athlete received three attempts; those recording a mark of at least 64.00 metres advanced to the final. If fewer than 12 athletes achieved that distance, the top 12 would advance. The results of the qualifying round were then ignored. Finalists received three throws each, with the top eight competitors receiving an additional three attempts. The best distance among those six throws counted.

Records

Prior to the competition, the existing world and Olympic records were as follows.

No new world or Olympic records were set during the competition.

Schedule

All times are Australian Eastern Standard Time (UTC+10)

Results

Qualifying

Final

See also
 1997 Men's World Championships Discus Throw (Athens)
 1998 Men's European Championships Discus Throw (Budapest)
 1999 Men's World Championships Discus Throw (Seville)
 2001 Men's World Championships Discus Throw (Edmonton)
 2002 Men's European Championships Discus Throw (Munich)
 2003 Men's World Championships Discus Throw (Paris)

References

External links
 Results
 Official Report

Discus, Men's
Discus throw at the Olympics
Men's events at the 2000 Summer Olympics